Jisa-ye Kelarabad (also Romanized as Jīsā-ye Kelārābād; also known a sJīsā-ye Pā’īn and Jīsā-ye Soflá) is a village in Kelarabad Rural District, Kelarabad District, Abbasabad County, Mazandaran Province, Iran. At the 2006 census, its population was 204, in 59 families.

References 

Populated places in Abbasabad County